His Majesty King Saud Mosque is the largest mosque in the city of Jeddah and is located in Jeddah's Al-Sharafeyyah District.

The Mosque was designed by Abdel-Wahed El-Wakil and was finished in 1987. The Minaret reaches a height of

Layout and architecture 
The layout reminds of Persian four-iwan designs, such as the Great Mosque of Esfahan in Iran. The Mosque-Madrassa of Sultan Hassan in Cairo in Egypt may have served as model for the minaret and other features such as the decoration of the attic.  

The mosque itself is rectangular, almost square, with a rectangular court built somewhat offset to the west. Four iwans open to the central court. The iwans are not emphasized as individual structures as in the Persian examples but are mere openings in a large screen wall. The north and south iwans are each set in front of a domed hall that separate four pillared halls to the east and west. The west halls are divided by two pillars each into three naves with to bays. The larger east halls have three naves with five bays and eight pillars each. The east iwan is the largest and connects the court to the largest domed hall that rises between the longer pillared halls in front of the qibla wall. Irregularly shaped rooms fill the triangular spaces between the actual mosque and the outside facade on the north, south and east wall because the mosque is built at an angle to the street grid so that the qibla wall may point to Makkah. The west facade opens to the Medinah Road with a large cubic structure added to the northern end. The minaret of the mosque towers over the south west corner of this structure that has a large iwan opening to the south leading into a domed hall that connects to a corridor that runs along the west wall of the mosque. This large Iwan with the minaret on the left and the mosque connecting at a right angle to the right, both accessible by a flight of steps, form an iconic group that easily catches the eye when looking north along the Medinah road.

Gallery

See also

 List of mosques in Saudi Arabia
  Lists of mosques 
 List of things named after Saudi Kings

References

External links 

1987 establishments in Saudi Arabia
King Saud Mosque
Mosques completed in 1987
New Classical architecture
Abdel-Wahed El-Wakil buildings